Mifi is a department of West Province in Cameroon. The department covers an area of 402 km and as of 2005 had a total population of 301,456. The capital of the department lies at Bafoussam.

Subdivisions
The department is divided administratively into 4 communes and in turn into villages.

Communes 
 Bafoussam (Urban)
 Bafoussam (Rural)
 Bamougoum 
 Lafé-Baleng

References

Departments of Cameroon
West Region (Cameroon)